George Higgins may refer to:
 George C. Higgins (1845–1933), Massachusetts politician
 George Higgins (cricketer) (1868–1951), English cricketer active 1894 to 1895 who played for Essex
 George G. Higgins (1916–2002), labor activist
 George Higgins (footballer, born 1880), Scottish footballer (Queen's Park FC)
 George Higgins (footballer, born 1925), Scottish footballer (Blackburn Rovers, Bolton Wanderers, Grimsby Town)
 George V. Higgins (1939–1999), American writer
 George W. Higgins, American minister of the Holy Ghost and Us Society
 George Higgins, character in the film 8mm